Luke Bowanko (born June 13, 1991) is a former American football center. He was drafted by the Jacksonville Jaguars in the sixth round of the 2014 NFL Draft. He played college football at Virginia.

Professional career

Jacksonville Jaguars
Bowanko was drafted 205th overall in the sixth round of the 2014 NFL Draft by the Jacksonville Jaguars. The pick used to select Bowanko was traded by the San Francisco 49ers in exchange for Blaine Gabbert. He made his first career start at center in week three against the Indianapolis Colts.

Bowanko started out the 2016 season on PUP after suffering a torn labrum and was activated to the active roster on December 10, 2016 prior to Week 14.

Baltimore Ravens
On September 2, 2017, Bowanko was traded to the Baltimore Ravens. He played in all 16 games in 2017, starting one at left tackle in place of the injured Ronnie Stanley.

New England Patriots
On April 4, 2018, Bowanko signed with the New England Patriots. On September 1, 2018, Bowanko was released by the Patriots.

Washington Redskins
Bowanko signed with the Washington Redskins on November 5, 2018, following season ending injuries to starting offensive linemen Brandon Scherff, and Shawn Lauvao.

Detroit Lions
On June 10, 2019, Bowanko signed with the Detroit Lions. He was released during final roster cuts on August 30, 2019.

References

External links
Virginia Cavaliers bio
Jacksonville Jaguars bio

1991 births
Living people
American football centers
Baltimore Ravens players
Detroit Lions players
Jacksonville Jaguars players
New England Patriots players
People from Clifton, Virginia
Players of American football from Virginia
Sportspeople from Fairfax County, Virginia
Virginia Cavaliers football players
Washington Redskins players